Donny Ray Willett (born July 16, 1966) is a United States circuit judge of the United States Court of Appeals for the Fifth Circuit. He was previously appointed by Texas Governor Rick Perry to serve as a justice of the Supreme Court of Texas on August 24, 2005, when former Justice Priscilla Owen created a vacancy on that court by joining the Fifth Circuit.

Early life and background 
Willett was born and raised in Talty in Kaufman County. His adoptive father died at the age of 40, when Willett was six, and he and his older sister, Donna, were reared by their mother, Doris, who waited tables to support the family. Neither of Willett's parents finished high school. Willett attended public schools in Forney in Kaufman County, graduating in 1984. He then became his family's first college graduate.

Willett received a triple-major Bachelor of Business Administration (economics, finance, public administration) from Baylor University in 1988. While at Baylor, he was a member of the Baylor Chamber of Commerce. He received his Juris Doctor with honors, along with a Master of Arts in political science, from Duke University School of Law and Duke University, respectively, in 1992.

After law school, Willett worked as a clerk for Judge Jerre Stockton Williams at the United States Court of Appeals for the Fifth Circuit. He then practiced employment and labor law in the Austin office of Haynes and Boone, LLP from 1993 to 1996. During that time, he also served as a senior fellow with the Texas Public Policy Foundation. Willett has also served as a non-resident fellow with the Program for Research on Religion and Urban Civil Society at the University of Pennsylvania.

In April 1996, Willett joined then-Governor George W. Bush's administration as Director of Research and Special Projects, advising on various legal and policy issues. In 2000–2001, Willett worked on the Bush-Cheney presidential campaign and transition team. In the White House, Willett was Special Assistant to the President and Director of Law and Policy for the White House Office of Faith-Based and Community Initiatives (WHOFBCI). He drafted the first two executive orders of the Bush presidency, one creating the WHOFBCI and the other creating related offices in five cabinet agencies. In early 2002, Willett was appointed Deputy Assistant Attorney General for Office of Legal Policy at the United States Department of Justice, where he helped coordinate the selection and confirmation of federal judges. He also supervised policy initiatives such as the PROTECT Act of 2003 to combat child abduction and exploitation. Willett also led the development of an executive order to expedite U.S. citizenship for immigrant service members fighting in Iraq and Afghanistan.

He returned to Texas in early 2003 to become Deputy Texas Attorney General for Legal Counsel in the office of newly elected Texas Attorney General Greg Abbott. As the attorney general's chief legal counsel, Willett led the agency's core legal divisions (opinion committee, open records, general counsel, public finance, intergovernmental relations, and litigation technical support). In addition to giving the attorney general legal advice on various issues, Willett also helped with select litigation, including efforts to protect the Ten Commandments monument on the Texas Capitol grounds and also the Pledge of Allegiance when it was challenged for including the words "under God."

Willett was serving in this Deputy Attorney General position when he was appointed to the Texas Supreme Court in August 2005.

Willett sits on the advisory board for the Honors College at his alma mater, Baylor University, which named Willett a Distinguished Young Alumnus in 2005. He also served on the national steering committee for Baylor's proposal to secure the Bush Presidential Library.  Willett is on the national advisory board for ConSource (The Constitutional Sources Project), a free, online library of U.S. founding-era source material. For Constitution Day 2008, Willett authored a commentary in the Austin American-Statesman highlighting ConSource and its nonprofit educational mission to make these historical documents accessible to teachers, students, academics, lawyers and judges. Willett is a fellow of the Texas Bar Foundation, the Austin Bar Foundation, and is a member of the American Law Institute.

Willett was mentioned and quoted in a March 2008 column in The Washington Post by conservative commentator George F. Will, who favorably discussed a book review Willett wrote in the fall 2007 issue of the Texas Review of Law and Politics, on whose advisory board Willett sits. Willett is also mentioned favorably in David Kuo's book, Tempting Faith: An Inside Story of Political Seduction  (2006), which criticizes the Bush administration's pursuit of the president's faith-based agenda.

Texas Supreme Court

2006 election 
Willett was one of five incumbent justices on the 2006 ballot, but he was the only one who faced opposition; his four colleagues were unopposed in both the March 7 primary and the November 7 general elections. In the March primary, Willett narrowly defeated former Justice Steven Wayne Smith, who sought to regain the seat on the Court that he had lost in the 2004 Republican primary to Justice Paul Green. In the general election, Willett won 51% of the votes and defeated Democratic Party nominee Bill Moody, who got 45% (2.12 million votes to Moody's 1.87 million).

2012 election 
Willett defeated an intraparty challenge from Steve Smith in the May 29, 2012, Republican primary, but the contest attracted little attention. The publication Texas Conservative Review endorsed Willett and described the Smith campaign as "lackluster." The Review wrote that Smith seemed more intent in seeking "revenge for past losses than making a positive impact" on the high court.

In the general election, Willett received 4,758,725 votes (78.8 percent) to 1,280,900 votes (21.2 percent) for the Libertarian nominee, R. S. Roberto Koelsch.

According to SCOTUSblog, in the 2012 election "Willett embraced Twitter as a way to get his campaign message across, and Twitter embraced him back."

Tenure 
Willett authored several notable decisions over the course of his service on the Texas high court, all of which can be found on the Court's official website and on Google Scholar.
All Texas Supreme Court justices have liaison assignments to help improve different aspects of the civil justice system. Willett was liaison to the Texas Center for Legal Ethics and Professionalism, the Task Force to Ensure Judicial Readiness in Times of Emergency, and the Court Reporters Certification Board.

In May 2016, Willett appeared on presidential candidate Donald Trump's list of potential U.S. Supreme Court justices.

In 2016, Willett received a Master of Laws from Duke University School of Law.

Federal judicial service 
On September 28, 2017, President Donald Trump announced his intent to nominate Willett to an undetermined seat on the United States Court of Appeals for the Fifth Circuit. On October 3, 2017, Willett was officially nominated to the seat vacated by Judge Emilio M. Garza, who assumed senior status on August 1, 2012.

On November 15, 2017, a hearing on his nomination was held before the Senate Judiciary Committee. On December 7, 2017, Willett's nomination was reported out of committee by an 11–9 vote. On December 12, 2017, the United States Senate agreed to invoke cloture on his nomination by a 50–48 vote. On December 13, 2017 his nomination was confirmed by a 50–47 vote. He received his judicial commission on January 2, 2018, and was sworn in the same day.

Willett was considered a potential Supreme Court nominee for President Donald Trump.

Judicial philosophy
According to SCOTUSblog, "Willett views the role of judges as protecting individual liberty by striking down laws that infringe on it." In addition, "Willett's belief in the primacy of individual liberty makes him a defender of religious as well as economic freedoms." SCOTUSblog described Willett as "more inclined to defer to the legislature in cases that he does not view as impinging on individual economic or religious liberty." Like Neil Gorsuch, Willett "has made a point of writing separately to declare his principles."

In February 2019, Reason wrote that Willett had been "making a name for himself" in the area of criminal justice reform and that "it would appear that advocates of criminal justice reform have a new champion on the federal bench." Reason cited Willett's critique of the legal doctrine of qualified immunity, which shields government officials from being sued for discretionary actions performed within their official capacity. In August 2018, Willett concurred dubitante when the court found that the Texas Medical Board was entitled to qualified immunity for an unconstitutional warrantless search it made of a doctor's patient records, writing: "To some observers, qualified immunity smacks of unqualified impunity, letting public officials duck consequences for bad behavior."

Awards 
Willett was named Outstanding Young Alumnus of Baylor University in 2005 and inducted into the Forney High School Hall of Honor in 2007. He has received the Faith and Integrity in Legal Services Award and the Austin Under 40 Award for Government and Public Affairs.

Willett received the Texas Review of Law and Politics's 2014 Distinguished Jurist of the Year Award. Each spring, the Texas Review of Law & Politics awards its Distinguished Jurist of the Year award to an individual who has made valuable contributions both to the journal and to conservative causes of national importance.

Personal life 
Willett is a former rodeo bull rider. He and his wife, Tiffany, married in 2000. They live in Austin, Texas, and have three children. Tiffany served as litigation director for a member of the Texas Senate, and in D.C. as education director for the White House Fellows. When they left the Bush administration in 2003 to return home to Texas, she worked for Texas CASA, which advocates for abused and neglected children in the court system.

Willett is known for his active Twitter presence, though he has not tweeted since his appointment to the federal bench. The Texas House of Representatives named him "Tweeter Laureate."

In 2017, Willett helped perform the Heimlich maneuver on a diner at  Chick-fil-A who was choking.

Electoral history 
2006

2012

See also 
 Donald Trump Supreme Court candidates
 List of justices of the Texas Supreme Court

References

External links 

  
 
 Questionnaire for Judicial Nominees for the United States Senate Committee on the Judiciary	
 Nominee Report  from the Alliance for Justice	
 Contributor profile from the Federalist Society
 Statement of Texas Attorney General Greg Abbott on the appointment of Willett
 Willett's op-ed in the Austin American-Statesman on Constitution Day 2008
 Website for Baylor Alumni Association article listing Outstanding Young Alumni for 2005
 Website with links to some of Willett's opinions

|-

1966 births
Living people
20th-century American lawyers
21st-century American lawyers
21st-century American judges
Baylor University alumni
Duke University alumni
Duke University School of Law alumni
Federalist Society members
George W. Bush administration personnel
Judges of the United States Court of Appeals for the Fifth Circuit
People from Austin, Texas
People from Forney, Texas
People from Kaufman County, Texas
Texas lawyers
Texas Republicans
Justices of the Texas Supreme Court
United States court of appeals judges appointed by Donald Trump
United States Department of Justice lawyers
Conservatism in the United States